Wellington Wildlife Management Area is a wildlife management area located  southwest of Winkler, Manitoba, Canada. It was established in 2006 under the Manitoba Wildlife Act.

See also
 List of wildlife management areas in Manitoba
 List of protected areas of Manitoba

References

External links
 Wellington Wildlife Management Area
 iNaturalist: Wellington Wildlife Management Area

Protected areas established in 2006
Wildlife management areas of Manitoba
Protected areas of Manitoba